"Praise the Lord" is a country music song by Breland featuring Thomas Rhett and is the third single from Breland's debut album Cross Country. It was released by Bad Realm and Atlantic Records on March 7, 2022, and debuted at number 100 on the Billboard Hot 100.

Background
The song was written by Breland, Julian Bunetta, David Garcia, Jacob Durrett, Jessie Jo Dillon, Kyle Fishman, Hardy, and Thomas Rhett. Rhett stated that the first time he heard the song, he was dancing and throwing his hands in the air and that he was grateful that Breland allowed him to write a verse for the song. One set of lyrics says "Praise the Lord for east Atlanta, Country Grammar, and my nana," which references Nelly's  2000 album Country Grammar.

Release and reception
Breland played the song on the road for about a year prior to its release. In February 2022, Breland posted a teaser of the song to TikTok which received over 160.1K likes and 964.5K views in less than twenty-four hours. The song debuted at number 100 on the Billboard Hot 100. The song premiered on the US Billboard Hot Country chart on March 19, 2022. The song spent eight weeks on the charts, peaking at number twenty-one on March 26, 2022.

Taste of Country wrote that the song is "a groovy, upbeat tribute to the simple things that make a country life worth living."

Performances
On April 12, 2022, Breland and Rhett performed the duet at a sold-out Breland & Friends benefit concert for the Oasis Center at the Ryman Auditorium. On April 11, 2022, Breland performed the song at the CMT Music Awards.

Breland also performed the song at Stagecoach Festival on April 29, 2022.

Breland and Thomas Rhett also performed the song live at the 2022 Academy of Country Music Awards.

Charts

Weekly charts

Year-end charts

The song also debuted on the Billboard Country Streaming Songs chart on March 26, 2022, remaining on the chart for five weeks and peaking at number 20.

Certification

References

2022 singles
2022 songs
Breland (musician) songs
Thomas Rhett songs
Songs written by Hardy (singer)
Songs written by Thomas Rhett
Songs written by Julian Bunetta
Atlantic Records singles
Songs written by David Garcia (musician)
Male vocal duets
Songs written by Breland (musician)